Toxochitona sankuru is a butterfly in the family Lycaenidae. It is found in the Republic of the Congo, the Democratic Republic of the Congo (Sankuru), Uganda and Zambia.

References

Butterflies described in 1961
Poritiinae